Joudeh George Joudeh Murqos (born March 1, 1959) was the Palestinian minister of tourism in the First Haniyeh Government (2006–2007). He was the only Christian minister of the government.

See also
Palestinian government of March 2006
Palestinian Christians

References

1959 births
Living people
Palestinian Christians
Government ministers of the Palestinian National Authority